Swimming at the 2013 Asian Youth Games was held in the Nanjing Olympic Sports Center Natatorium from 19 August to 23 August 2013 in Nanjing, China.

Medalists

Boys

Girls

Medal table

Results

Boys

50 m freestyle

21–22 August

100 m freestyle
22–23 August

200 m freestyle
20 August

50 m backstroke

22–23 August

100 m backstroke
19–20 August

200 m backstroke
21 August

50 m breaststroke
19–20 August

100 m breaststroke
20–21 August

200 m breaststroke
23 August

50 m butterfly
20–21 August

100 m butterfly
21–22 August

200 m butterfly
19 August

200 m individual medley
22 August

4 × 100 m freestyle relay
20 August

4 × 100 m medley relay
22 August

Girls

50 m freestyle
21–22 August

100 m freestyle
22–23 August

200 m freestyle
20 August

50 m backstroke
22–23 August

100 m backstroke
19–20 August

200 m backstroke
21 August

50 m breaststroke
19–20 August

100 m breaststroke
20–21 August

200 m breaststroke
23 August

50 m butterfly
20–21 August

100 m butterfly
21–22 August

200 m butterfly
19 August

200 m individual medley
22 August

4 × 100 m freestyle relay
19 August

4 × 100 m medley relay
21 August

References
 Boys’ 50m Freestyle Final Result
 Boys’ 100m Freestyle Final Result
 Boys’ 200m Freestyle Final Result
 Boys’ 50m Backstroke Final Result
 Boys′ 100m Backstroke Final Result
 Boys′ 200m Backstroke Final Result
 Boys′ 50m Breaststroke Final Result
 Boys′ 100m Breaststroke Final Result
 Boys′ 200m Breaststroke Final Result
 Boys′ 50m Butterfly Final Result
 Boys′ 100m Butterfly Final Result
 Boys′ 200m Butterfly Final Result
 Boys′ 200m Individual Medley Result
 Boys' 4×100m Freestyle Relay
 Boys' 4×100m Medley Relay
 Girls’ 50m Freestyle Final Result
 Girls’ 100m Freestyle Final Result
 Girls’ 200m Freestyle Final Result
 Girls’ 50m Backstroke Final Result
 Girls’ 100m Backstroke Final Result
 Girls’ 200m Backstroke Final Result
 Girls’ 50m Breaststroke Final Result
 Girls’ 100m Breaststroke Final Result
 Girls’ 200m Breaststroke Final Result
 Girls’ 50m Butterfly Final Result
 Girls’ 100m Butterfly Final Result
 Girls’ 200m Butterfly Final Result
 Girls’ 200m Individual Medley Result
 Girls’ 4×100m Freestyle Relay
 Girls’ 4×100m Medley Relay

External links
 Official Website

2013 Asian Youth Games events
Asian Youth Games
2013